Joseph Brand may refer to:

 Joseph Brand (biologist), American biologist
 Joseph Brand (MP) (1605–1674), English merchant, landowner and politician